Ochyrotica javanica is a moth of the family Pterophoridae. It is found on Java.

The wingspan is about 18 mm. The forewings are dirty white.

References

Moths described in 1988
Ochyroticinae